Franz Hrdlicka (15 October 1920 – 25 March 1945) was a Luftwaffe ace and recipient of the Knight's Cross of the Iron Cross during World War II. During his career Franz Hrdlicka was credited with 60 aerial victories.

Career
Hrdlicka was born on 15 October 1920 in Maxdorf in Mähren, present-day the suburb Dvorska of Brno in the Czech Republic. He volunteered for service in the Luftwaffe in late 1939. On 27 September 1944 he was shot down and wounded in combat with Supermarine Spitfires near Arnhem but managed to bail out. Following his 44th aerial victory, he was awarded the Knight's Cross of the Iron Cross on 9 August 1944. He was transferred to Jagdgeschwader 2 "Richthofen" (JG 2—2nd Fighter Wing) in mid-October 1944. There he first commanded the 1. Staffel as Staffelkapitän (squadron leader) before he was appointed Gruppenkommandeur (group commander) of the I. Gruppe of JG 2 "Richthofen" on 9 December 1944.

Hrdlicka was shot down by United States Army Air Forces fighters and killed in action on 25 March 1945 near Betzenrod, present-day a suburb of Schotten, Hesse. His remains were recovered on 8 September 1951. He had been nominated for the Knight's Cross of the Iron Cross with Oak Leaves which was not approved.

Awards and decorations
 Aviator badge
 Front Flying Clasp of the Luftwaffe in Gold
 Iron Cross (1939)
 2nd Class 
 1st Class 
 Wound Badge (1939)
 in Black
 Ehrenpokal der Luftwaffe on 13 September 1942 as Leutnant and pilot
 German Cross in Gold on 12 July 1943 as Oberleutnant in the II./Jagdgeschwader 77
 Knight's Cross of the Iron Cross on 9 August 1944 as Hauptmann and Staffelkapitän of the 5./Jagdgeschwader 77

Notes

References

Citations

Bibliography

 
 
 
 
 
 

1914 births
1983 deaths
People from Děčín
German Bohemian people
Luftwaffe pilots
German World War II flying aces
Recipients of the Gold German Cross
Recipients of the Knight's Cross of the Iron Cross
Aviators killed by being shot down
Luftwaffe personnel killed in World War II